Pablo Álvarez García (born 23 April 1997) is a Spanish professional footballer who plays as a midfielder for HNK Rijeka.

Career

Pablo Álvarez is a footballer trained in the lower categories Real Sporting de Gijón In 2013, Álvarez joined the youth academy of Spanish La Liga side Villarreal.

Before the second half of the 2017–18 season, he signed for the reserves of Alavés in the Spanish La Liga.

In 2018, Álvarez was sent on loan to Spanish fourth division club San Ignacio, where he suffered injuries.

Before the second half of the 2020–21 season, he signed for Cherno More in the Bulgarian top flight. In May 2022 Álvarez left the team after the expiration of his contract.

References

External links

 
 Pablo Álvarez at playmakerstats.com

Footballers from Oviedo
Spanish footballers
Living people
Spanish expatriates in Bulgaria
1997 births
Association football midfielders
Expatriate footballers in Bulgaria
Spanish expatriate footballers
First Professional Football League (Bulgaria) players
Segunda División B players
PFC Cherno More Varna players
HNK Rijeka players
Tercera División players
Deportivo Alavés B players